Cindy Heller Nemser (March 26, 1937 – January 26, 2021) was an American art historian and writer. Founder and editor of the Feminist Art Journal, she was an activist and prominent figure in the feminist art movement and was best known for her writing on the work of women artists such as Eva Hesse, Alice Neel, and Louise Nevelson.

Early life

Nemser was born Cecile Heller in Brooklyn, New York, the daughter of William Heller and Helen (Nelson) Heller. After attending Midwood High School, she earned a B.A. in Education and—while teaching elementary school—an M.A. in English and American Literature from Brooklyn College. She then enrolled at the Institute of Fine Arts at New York University, where she received her M.A. in Art History in 1966. While at the Institute, Nemser wrote exhibition reviews for Arts Magazine alongside her studies. In 1956, she married Charles S. Nemser.

Career
After completing an internship at the Museum of Modern Art, Nemser continued to be involved in the New York art scene in 1966 as a critic. Her articles covered contemporary realism, OP Art, body art, and other areas. She was the first critic to write about the work of several artists, including Chuck Close, Vito Acconci and Gordon Matta-Clark.

In 1972, Nemser was one of the founders of Women in the Arts, and was on the board of the collective which published the journal Woman and Art, along with Patricia Mainardi, Irene Peslikis, Irene Moss, Michele Wallace and Marjorie Kramer.

She was the publisher and editor of the Feminist Art Journal from 1972–1977, working with Patricia Mainardi for its first year of publication before continuing on as the FAJs sole editor. By 1977 when Nemser closed the FAJ, it had been instrumental in securing positions for creative women, achieved worldwide readership, and reached major public and university libraries as well as many prominent artists, art critics and historians.

In 1973, Nemser organized three panels on women in the arts for the artists’ division of the College Art Association. In 1973–1974, she was instrumental in conceiving Philadelphia Focus on the Visual Arts, or FOCUS, a multi-venue exhibition series. She worked with Diane Burko to make the festival a reality.

In 1975 Nemser authored Art Talk: Conversations with 12 Women Artists, which included interviews with Barbara Hepworth, Sonia Delaunay, Louise Nevelson, Lee Krasner, Alice Neel, Grace Hartigan, Marisol, Eva Hesse, Lila Katzen, Eleanor Antin, Audrey Flack, and Nancy Grossman. A reprint published by Harper Collins in 1995 also included conversations with Betye Saar, Isabel Bishop, and Janet Fish. She published Ben Cunningham: A Life with Color in 1989 and the novel Eve’s Delight in 1982. Her numerous articles have appeared in publications including Artforum, Art in America, Arts Magazine, The New York Times, The Village Voice, Newsday, Ms. magazine, The Journal of Aesthetic Education, and Art Education.

In 1977, Nemser became an associate of the Women's Institute for Freedom of the Press (WIFP), an American nonprofit publishing organization that works to increase communication between women and connect the public with forms of women-based media.

In the 1990s Nemser became a theater critic, writing for publications such as Theater Guild Quarterly. Feminism continued to influence her work on the dramatic arts, and exposed how sexism that permeated the theater world.

At the time of her death from pneumonia in 2021, she was completing her memoir Firebrand: Tales of the 70's Art World Told by a Feminist Art Critic.

Curating
Nemser was curator or co-curator of several exhibitions which celebrate female artists and feminist art:
 1974 — "In Her Own Image" at the Fleisher Art Memorial Gallery of the Philadelphia Museum of Art
 1974 — "FOCUS: Women’s Work — American Art in 1974" (with Marcia Tucker, Adele Breeskin, Anne d’Hanoncourt and sculptor Lila Katzen) at the Philadelphia Civic Center
 2007 — "Women’s Work: Homage to Feminist Art" at the Tabla Rasa Gallery in Brooklyn

References

Bibliography

External links 
Nemser (Cindy) papers at the Online Archive of California held at the Getty Research Institute, 1966–2012

1937 births
2021 deaths
American art historians
Women art historians
Writers from Brooklyn
Brooklyn College alumni
New York University Institute of Fine Arts alumni
Historians from New York (state)
Feminist bloggers
American art critics
American women curators
American curators